Otto C. Hess (October 10, 1878 – February 25, 1926) was a Swiss-born pitcher for the Cleveland Bronchos/Cleveland Naps (1902 and 1904–08) and Boston Braves (1912–15).

In 1914, Hess was a member of the Braves team that went from last place to first place in two months, becoming the first team to win a pennant after being in last place on the Fourth of July. Born in Bern, Hess was the first person born in Switzerland to play in Major League Baseball.

In 10 seasons he had a 70-90 win–loss record in 198 games, with 165 games started, 129 complete games, 18 shutouts, 5 saves, 1,418 innings pitched, 1,355 hits allowed, 663 runs allowed, 25 home runs allowed, 448 walks allowed, 580 strikeouts, 83 hit batsmen, 38 wild pitches and a 2.98 ERA. He died in Tucson, Arizona, at the age of 47.

Hess was a good hitting pitcher in his major league career, posting a .216 batting average (154-for-714) with 63 runs, 21 doubles, 9 triples, 5 home runs, 56 RBI and 27 bases on balls. He also played 51 games in the outfield and 6 games at first base.

See also
 List of Major League Baseball annual saves leaders
 List of Major League Baseball career hit batsmen leaders

References

External links

Otto Hess at SABR (Baseball BioProject)

1878 births
1926 deaths
Major League Baseball pitchers
Cleveland Naps players
Cleveland Bronchos players
Boston Braves players
Swiss emigrants to the United States
Major League Baseball players from Switzerland
Kansas City Blue Stockings players
New Orleans Pelicans (baseball) players
Vernon Tigers players
Atlanta Crackers players
Sportspeople from Bern